Richey Run is a stream in the U.S. state of Pennsylvania. It is a tributary to the Allegheny River.

A variant name is "Richies Run". The stream was named after the family of James Ritchey, a pioneer settler.

References

Rivers of Pennsylvania
Rivers of Clarion County, Pennsylvania
Rivers of Venango County, Pennsylvania